Leucas is a genus of plants in the family Lamiaceae, first described by Robert Brown in 1810. It contains over 200 species, widespread over much of Africa, and southern and eastern Asia (Iran, India, China, Japan, Indonesia, etc.) with a few species in Queensland and on various islands in the Indian Ocean.

Species
 The Plant List recognises 133 accepted species (including infraspecific names):

 Leucas abyssinica  
 var. argyrophylla  
 var. brachycalyx  
 Leucas aequistylosa  
 Leucas aggerestris  
 Leucas alba  
 Leucas alluaudii  
 Leucas anandaraoana  
 Leucas angularis  
 Leucas angustissima  
 Leucas argentea  
 var. neumannii  
 Leucas aspera  
 Leucas bakeri  
 Leucas beddomei  
 Leucas biflora  
 Leucas bracteosa  
 Leucas calostachys  
 var. schweinfurthii  
 Leucas capensis  
 Leucas cephalantha  
 Leucas cephalotes  
 Leucas chinensis  
 f. riukiuensis  
 Leucas ciliata  
 Leucas clarkei  
 Leucas collettii  
 Leucas cuneifolia  
 Leucas decemdentata  
 var. angustifolia  
 var. sebastiana  
 Leucas deflexa  
 var. biglomerulata  
 var. deflexa
 var. kondowensis  
 Leucas densiflora  
 Leucas deodikarii  
 Leucas dhofarensis  
 Leucas diffusa  
 Leucas discolor  
 Leucas ebracteata  
 Leucas ellipticifolia  
 Leucas eriostoma  
 var. lanata  
 Leucas flagellifera  
 Leucas fulvipila  
 Leucas glabrata  
 Leucas grandis  
 Leucas hagghierensis  
 Leucas helferi  
 Leucas helianthemifolia  
 Leucas helicterifolia  
 Leucas hephaestis  
 Leucas hirta  
 Leucas hirundinaris  
 Leucas hyssopifolia  
 Leucas inflata  
 Leucas jamesii  
 Leucas kishenensis  
 Leucas lamiifolia  
 Leucas lanata  
 Leucas lanceifolia  
 Leucas lavandulifolia  
 Leucas longifolia  
 Leucas macrantha  
 Leucas manipurensis  
 Leucas marrubioides  
 Leucas martinicensis  
 Leucas masaiensis  
 var. tricrenata  
 var. venulosa  
 Leucas mathewiana  
 Leucas menthifolia  
 var. fulva  
 var. menthifolia
 Leucas milanjiana  
 Leucas minimifolia  
 Leucas minutiflora  
 Leucas montana  
 Leucas mukerjiana  
 Leucas mwingensis  
 Leucas nepetifolia  
 Leucas neufliseana  
 Leucas neuflizeana  
 Leucas nubica  
 Leucas nutans  
 Leucas nyassae  
 var. velutina  
 Leucas oligocephala  
 var. bowalensis  
 var. oligocephala
 Leucas ovata  
 Leucas pearsonii  
 Leucas pechuelii  
 Leucas penduliflora  
 Leucas pilosa  
 Leucas prostrata  
 Leucas pseudoglabrata  
 Leucas pubescens  
 Leucas rosmarinifolia  
 Leucas royleoides  
 Leucas ruspoliana  
 Leucas samhaensis  
 Leucas sebaldiana  
 Leucas sexdentata  
 Leucas sivadasaniana  
 Leucas somalensis  
 Leucas songeana  
 Leucas spiculifera 
 Leucas spiculifolia  
 Leucas stachydiformis  
 Leucas stelligera  
 Leucas stormsii  
 Leucas stricta  
 Leucas subarcuata  
 Leucas suffruticosa  
 Leucas teres  
 Leucas tettensis  
 Leucas tomentosa  
 Leucas tsavoensis  
 Leucas urticifolia  
 Leucas urundensis  
 Leucas usagarensis  
 Leucas vestita  
 var. angustifolia  
 var. oblongifolia  
 var. sericostoma  
 Leucas virgata  
 Leucas volkensii  
 Leucas welwitschii  
 Leucas wightiana  
 Leucas wilsonii  
 Leucas zeylanica  
 var. walkeri  
A new species, Leucas sahyadriensis Sunojk., has recently been described and is endemic to the Western Ghats of southern India.

References

 
Lamiaceae genera
Taxa named by Robert Brown (botanist, born 1773)